Dmytro Viktorovych Yakushyn (born January 21, 1978) is a Ukrainian former professional ice hockey player. He also played two games for the Toronto Maple Leafs in the 1999–00 season. The rest of his career, which lasted from 1998 to 2013, was spent in the minor leagues and then later in Europe. Internationally Yakushyn played for the Ukrainian national team in three World Championships. As a youth, he played in the 1992 Quebec International Pee-Wee Hockey Tournament with a team from Kharkiv.

Career statistics

Regular season and playoffs

International

References

External links
 

1978 births
Living people
AaB Ishockey players
Edmonton Ice players
Expatriate ice hockey players in Canada
HC Donbass players
HC Dynamo Kharkiv players
HK Gomel players
HK Neman Grodno players
Keramin Minsk players
Metallurg Zhlobin players
Regina Pats players
St. John's Maple Leafs players
Sokil Kyiv players
Sportspeople from Kharkiv
Toronto Maple Leafs draft picks
Toronto Maple Leafs players
Ukrainian ice hockey coaches
Ukrainian ice hockey defencemen
Ukrainian expatriate sportspeople in Canada